Epigelasma crenifera is a species of moth of the  family Geometridae. It is found in North Madagascar.

The antennae of both sexes are bipectinated over 3/4 of its length. The upper side of the body is green-blue, the underside of the body and legs are white, with a reddish front side for the first pair of legs. 
The length of the forewings is 14 mm, the upper side of the wings is blueish-green, the underside is white.

References

Geometrinae
Moths described in 1970
Lepidoptera of Madagascar
Moths of Madagascar
Moths of Africa